The 1996 Baton Rouge mayoral election was held on September 21, 1996, to elect the mayor-president of Baton Rouge, Louisiana. It saw the reelection of incumbent Thomas Edward "Tom Ed" McHugh.

Results

References 

1996 Louisiana elections
1996
Baton Rouge